Mostafa Ajorlu (born 1960) is an Iranian military officer in the Islamic Revolutionary Guard Corps and football administrator. He was the chairman of Tractor club from 2016 to 2018. He had been elected as the administrator of  Esteghlal F.C. from 25 September 2021 to 2022.

Previous positions 
Ajorlu headed the following clubs:
 Moghavemat Tehran (1996–1998)
 Fath Tehran (1998–1999)
 Pas (2000–2005)
 Steel Azin (2009–2010)
 Tractor (2016–2018)
 Esteghlal (2021–2022)

See also 
 Hamidreza Moghaddamfar

References

 
 
 

1960 births
Academic staff of Imam Hossein University
Imam Hossein University alumni
University of Tehran alumni
Iranian football chairmen and investors
Living people
Iranian sports executives and administrators
Islamic Revolutionary Guard Corps second brigadier generals
Islamic Revolutionary Guard Corps personnel of the Iran–Iraq War